The Lola T91/50 is an open-wheel formula race car chassis developed by British manufacturer Lola, for use in various international Formula 3000 championships, in 1991.

References 

Open wheel racing cars
International Formula 3000
Lola racing cars